Lydia Chekwel (born 16 August 1964) is a Ugandan politician and teacher representing Kween District as the district woman member of Parliament in the 9th and10th Parliament of Uganda. She stood as an independent politician in the 10th Parliament of Uganda. However, in the 9th Parliament, she was affiliated to the National Resistance Movement political party.

Education 
In 1976, she completed her Primary Leaving Examinations from Moyok Primary School. In 1981, she attained a Uganda Advanced Certificate of Education from St Elizabeth Senior Secondary School, Kidetok. In 1988, she was awarded a Primary Teachers' Certificate from Institute of Teacher Education Kyambogo and later returned to Institute of Teacher Education Kyambogo for a Diploma in Teacher Education in 2000. In 2008, she was awarded a Bachelor's degree in Education from Kyambogo University.

Career life before joining politics 
From 1988 to 2000, she was employed as a teacher at Chemwania Primary School and later joined Kapchorwa Primary Teachers College as a tutor from 2000 to 2011.

Political career 
From 2011 to date, she was the Member of Parliament at the Parliament of Uganda. She served on the professional body as a member of Red Cross and a full member of Teachers Association. She also served on additional roles at the Parliament of Uganda on the Committee on Human Rights and Committee on Education and Sports. She is a Member of UWOPA of 10th Parliament.

Lydia Chekwel, the incumbent Woman MP, since 2011 is battling her niece, Rose Emma Cherukut, who is popularly known as Pakalast, the former Kapchorwa Resident District Commissioner (RDC). In the 2021 elections, Chekwel decided to run as an Independent again after losing to Cherukut in the party primaries. Cherukut got 19,004 votes while Chekwel scored 15,041 votes.

Personal life 
She is Married to Alfred Barteka, the brother of Andrew Yesho, who is Ms Cherukut's father. Lydia's hobbies are working with women and children, reading papers and adventuring. She has special interests in guidance and counseling women and youth, organizing and helping women and youth, supporting communities construct schools and churches/mosques.

See also 

 List of members of the tenth Parliament of Uganda
 List of members of the ninth Parliament of Uganda
 Independent politician
 National Resistance Movement
 Kween District
 Parliament of Uganda

External links 

 Website of the Parliament of Uganda
 Hon. Lydia Chekwel on Facebook
 Website of UWOPA

References 

Living people
1964 births
Independent politicians
National Resistance Movement politicians
Ugandan academics
Members of the Parliament of Uganda
Women members of the Parliament of Uganda
Kyambogo University alumni